There are an estimated 392 waterfalls in Iran, 287 of which are substantial. Among them:

 Shahlolak Waterfall, is a permanent waterfall in Charmahin, Isfahan
 Atashgah Waterfall, the longest waterfall in Iran located in Chaharmahal and Bakhtiari
 Zarlimeh Waterfall, the widest waterfall in Iran located in Chaharmahal and Bakhtiar
 Ceredit Waterfall, the wildest waterfall in Iran located in Chaharmahal and Bakhtiari
 Asiab Kharabeh Waterfall, Eskander Waterfall (known as Malek Kian Waterfall), Maharan Waterfall all three are located in the East Azerbaijan Province
 Sibiye-Khani Waterfall is located in Lerd tourist village,Khalkhal county,Ardabil province.
 Shalmash Waterfall  located in the West Azerbaijan Province
 Nashtrood Waterfall is located in Alborz, Karaj Province
 Goorgoor Waterfall, Sardabeh Waterfall located in Ardabil
 Khezr Waterfall, Kord Ali Waterfall, Takht-e Soleiman Waterfall, Bibi Seydan Waterfall, Poonehzar Waterfall of Fereydunshahr, Semirom Waterfall located in Isfahan
 Cham Av Waterfall is located in Ilam
 Sangan Waterfall, Imamzadeh Davood Waterfall, Osun Darband Waterfall, Dogholu Waterfall, Pich Adaran Seasonal Waterfall all located in Tehran
 Sheikh Alikhan Waterfall is located in Chaharmahal and Bakhtiari
 Tunele Koohrang Waterfall is located in Chaharmahal and Bakhtiari
 Darreh Eshgh Waterfall is located in Chaharmahal and Bakhtiari
 Karoudy Kan Waterfall is located in Chaharmahal and Bakhtiari
 Niakan Waterfall is located in Chaharmahal and Bakhtiari
 Shevi Waterfall located in Khuzestan Province (It is the largest natural waterfall in the Middle East and one of the most beautiful waterfalls in Iran)
 Ortokand Waterfall, Akhlamad Waterfall located in Khorasan Razavi
 Margoon Waterfall, Tarom Waterfall located in Fars
 Varvar Waterfall is located in Anbarabad in Kerman
 Sarand Kuh Waterfall (Darin) in Anbarabad in Kerman
 Raeen Waterfall in Kerman
 Ordikan Waterfall in Kerman
 Bal Waterfall in Kurdistan
 Bahram Bigi Boyerahmad Waterfall, Kanj Banar Gachsaran Waterfall, Sisakht Waterfall, Kamardoogh waterfall located in Kohgiluyeh and Boyerahmad
 Minoodasht Waterfall, Shirabad Waterfall, Kaboudwal Waterfall in Golestan
 Latoon Waterfall in Gilan
 Aznader Waterfall, Bishe Waterfall, Chakan Waterfall, Taf Waterfall, Nojian Waterfall, Varak Waterfall, Talai Waterfall in Lorestan
 Yakhi Waterfall, Shahandasht Waterfall, Amiri waterfall, Harijan Waterfall, Amol Waterfall, Ij or Dah Gholoo Waterfall in Mazandaran [3] [4] [5]

Many of Iran's waterfalls, such as Akhlamad, Afrineh, Ganjnameh, Niasar, Shushtar, Bishe, Gharah Su, Semirom, Vashi Strait, and Shahlolak Charmahin have a historical history and economic use. These waterfalls are great places for many tourist visits in Iran. Most of them are assisted by water grids.

During the rule of the Sassanids the Shushtar waterfalls were the first facilities for the water industry in the world. Shushtar waterfalls and Ganjnameh waterfall in Hamedan, along with historical inscriptions of Cyrus, have been historically registered in UNESCO, showing the glorious peak of ancient Iran.

Tallest waterfalls 

Permanent waterfalls above 80 meters in height

 Varvar Waterfall, with a height of 176 meters
 Nashtrood Waterfall, with a height of 110 meters
 Latoon Waterfall, 105 meters high
 Sarankuh Waterfall, with a height of over one hundred meters
 Darreh Eshgh Waterfall, with a height of about one hundred meters
 Piran Waterfall, with a height of about one hundred meters
 Shevi Waterfall, with a height of about one hundred meters
 Nojian Waterfall, with a height of about 90 meters
 Kordavi Kan Waterfall, with a height of more than 80 meters
 Margoon Waterfall, 80 meters high (more than ninety meters wide)
 Akhlamad Waterfall, with a height of about 80 meters
 Absefid Waterfall, with a height of about 70 meters
 Poonehzar Waterfall, with a height of more than 70 meters
 Shahlolak Waterfall, with a height of about 70 meters

 Berenjeh Waterfall, with a height of 750 meters is a seasonal waterfall

References 

Waterfalls of Iran